Dorien is a given name, a variant of Dorian. People with this name include:


Men
Dorien Bryant (born 1985), American former footballer (male)
Dorien Wilson (born 1963), American actor

Women
Dorien DeTombe (born 1947), Dutch sociologist 
Dorien Herremans, Belgian computer music researcher
Dorien Rookmaker (born 1964), Dutch politician
Dorien de Vries (born 1965), Dutch sailor
Dorien Wamelink (born 1970), Dutch former professional tennis player

Fictional characters
Dorien Green, a female character in the 1990s British TV series Birds of a Feather

See also
''Dorien, a 2017 Spanish psychological horror thriller TV series

Given names